The 2011 Assen Superbike World Championship round was the third round of the 2011 Superbike World Championship. It took place on the weekend of April 15–17, 2011 at the TT Circuit Assen located in Assen, Netherlands.

Classification

Superbike race 1 classification

Superbike race 2 classification

Supersport race classification

Assen Round
Superbike World Championship Round